The Eurasian blue tit (Cyanistes caeruleus) is a small passerine bird in the tit family, Paridae. It is easily recognisable by its blue and yellow plumage and small size.

Eurasian blue tits, usually resident and non-migratory birds, are widespread and a common resident breeder throughout temperate and subarctic Europe and the western Palearctic in deciduous or mixed woodlands with a high proportion of oak. They usually nest in tree holes, although they easily adapt to nest boxes where necessary. Their main rival for nests and in the search for food is the larger and more common great tit.

The Eurasian blue tit prefers insects and spiders for its diet. Outside the breeding season, they also eat seeds and other vegetable-based foods. The birds are famed for their acrobatic skills, as they can hold on to the outermost branches of trees and shrubs and hang upside down when looking for food.

Taxonomy 
The Eurasian blue tit was described by Carl Linnaeus in 1758 in the 10th edition of his Systema Naturae under the binomial name Parus caeruleus. Parus is the classical Latin for a tit and caeruleus is the Latin for dark blue or cerulean. Two centuries earlier, before the introduction of the binomial nomenclature, the same Latin name had been used by the Swiss naturalist Conrad Gesner when he described and illustrated the blue tit in his Historiae animalium of 1555.

In 2005, analysis of the mtDNA cytochrome b sequences of the Paridae indicated that Cyanistes was an early offshoot from the lineage of other tits, and more accurately regarded as a genus rather than a subgenus of Parus. The current genus name, Cyanistes, is from the Ancient Greek , "dark blue". The African blue tit (Cyanistes teneriffae) was formerly considered conspecific.

Subspecies 
There are currently at least nine recognised subspecies:

 C. c. caeruleus – (Linnaeus, 1758): the nominate subspecies, occurring in Continental Europe to northern Spain, Sicily, northern Turkey and northern Urals
 C. c. obscurus – (Pražák, 1894): found in Ireland, Britain and Channel Islands
 C. c. ogliastrae – (Hartert, 1905): found in Portugal, southern Spain, Corsica and Sardinia
 C. c. balearicus – (von Jordans, 1913): found on Majorca Island (Balearic Islands)
 C. c. calamensis – (Parrot, 1908): found in southern Greece, Pelopónnisos, Cyclades, Crete and Rhodes
 C. c. orientalis – Zarudny & Loudon, 1905: found in southern European Russia (Volga River to central and southern Urals)
 C. c. satunini – Zarudny, 1908: found in the Crimean Peninsula, Caucasus, Transcaucasia and northwestern Iran to eastern Turkey
 C. c. raddei – Zarudny, 1908: found in northern Iran
 C. c. persicus – (Blanford, 1873): found in the Zagros Mountains

Hybrids 
Pleske's tit (Cyanistes × pleskei) is a common interspecific hybrid between this species and the azure tit (Cyanistes cyanus), in western Russia. The cap is usually darker than the azure tit, and the tail is paler than the Eurasian blue tit.

Description 
A typical Eurasian blue tit has an azure-blue crown and dark blue line passing through the eye, and encircling the white cheeks to the chin, giving the bird a very distinctive appearance. The forehead and a bar on the wing are white. The nape, wings and tail are blue and the back is yellowish green. The underparts is mostly sulphur-yellow with a dark line down the abdomen—the yellowness is indicative of the number of yellowy-green caterpillars eaten, due to high levels of carotene pigments in the diet. The bill is black, the legs bluish grey, and the irides dark brown. The sexes are similar and often indistinguishable to human eyes, but under ultraviolet light, males have a brighter blue crown. Young blue tits are noticeably more yellow.

Distribution and habitat 

There are currently around 20–44 million pairs in Europe.

The Eurasian blue tit and the related hybrids are considered native species in areas of the European continent with a mainly temperate or Mediterranean climate, and in parts of the Middle East. These areas include Ireland, the United Kingdom and most of the European Union and EFTA (except Malta, where they are considered vagrant, and Iceland, where they are absent), plus: Albania, Algeria, Andorra, Armenia, Azerbaijan, Belarus, Bosnia and Herzegovina, Georgia, Iran, Iraq, Jordan, Kazakhstan, Lebanon, Libya, Moldova, Montenegro, Morocco, North Macedonia, Russia, San Marino, Serbia, Syria, Tunisia, Turkey, Vatican City and Ukraine.

In Great Britain the Eurasian blue tit can be found in a variety of environments, and is typically found in deciduous woodland, parks, gardens and even in the centre of towns.

Behaviour and ecology 
Eurasian blue and great tits form mixed winter flocks, and the former are perhaps the better gymnasts in the slender twigs. A Eurasian blue tit will often ascend a trunk in short jerky hops, reminiscent of a treecreeper. As a rule the bird roosts in ivy or evergreens, but in harsh winters will roost wherever there is a suitable small hole, be it in a tree or nesting box. They are very agile and can hang from almost anywhere.

This is a common and popular European garden bird, due to its perky acrobatic performances when feeding on nuts or suet. It swings beneath the holder, calling "tee, tee, tee" or a scolding "churr".

Breeding 

The Eurasian blue tit will nest in any suitable hole in a tree, wall, or stump, or an artificial nest box, often competing with house sparrows or great tits for the site. Few birds more readily accept the shelter of a nesting box; the same hole is returned to year after year, and when one pair dies another takes possession. It is estimated by the RSPB that there are 3,535,000 breeding pairs in the UK.

During the incubation period, female blue tits perform all of the incubation, however the male feeds the female during this time. During the nestling period both female nest attendance and male feeding rate are higher in the morning, declining throughout the day. Although socially monogamous, blue tits regularly engage in extra-pair copulations with other individuals.

Egg size appears to depend mostly on the size of individual females and secondarily on habitat, with smaller eggs found at higher altitudes. The clutch's total weight can be 1.5 times as heavy as the female bird.A study found that the timing of breeding in blue tits is related to the expression of nestling carotenoid‐based coloration, which could play a role in offspring–parent communication.

The bird is a close sitter, hissing and biting at an intruding finger. In the South West of England such behaviour has earned the Eurasian blue tit the colloquial nickname "Little Billy Biter" or "Billy Biter", originating from the UK. When protecting its eggs it raises its crest, but this is a sign of excitement rather than anger, for it is also elevated during nuptial display. The nesting material is usually moss, wool, hair and feathers, and the eggs are laid in April or May. The number in the clutch is often very large, but seven or eight are normal, clutch size varies with latitude and other geographic parameters. Some bigger clutches may be laid by two or even more hens in some locations but single hen clutches of 14 have been verified in the UK. It is not unusual for a single bird to feed the chicks in the nest at a rate of one feed every 90 seconds during the height of the breeding season. In winter they form flocks with other tit species.

In an analysis carried out using ring-recovery data in Britain, the survival rate for juveniles in their first year was 38%, while the adult annual survival rate was 53%. From these figures the typical lifespan is only three years. Within Britain, the maximum recorded age is 10 years and 3 months for a bird that was ringed in Bedfordshire. The maximum recorded age overall is 11 years and 7 months for a bird in the Czech Republic.

Diet 

The Eurasian blue tit feeds on many insects, though it is fond of young buds of various trees, especially when insect prey is scarce, and may pull them to bits in the hope of finding insects. It is a well-known predator of many Lepidoptera species including the Wood Tiger moth. No species, however, destroys more coccids and aphids, the worst foes of many plants. It takes leaf miner grubs and green tortrix moths (Tortricidae). In common with all members of the family, seeds are also eaten.

Voice 

Eurasian blue tits use songs and calls throughout the year. Songs are mostly used in late winter and spring to defend the territory or to attract mates. Calls are used for multiple reasons. Communication with other Eurasian blue tits is the most important motivation for the use of calls. They inform one another on their location in trees by means of contact-calls. They use alarm-calls to warn others (including birds of other species such as the great tit, the European robin or the treecreeper) about the presence of predators in the neighbourhood. Scolding, for example, is used when a ground predator (e.g. fox, cat or dog), a low flying predator or a perched owl are noticed. Sometimes this is followed by mobbing behaviour in which birds gather together in flocks to counter a predator. The alarm-whistle warns other birds about the proximity of a Eurasian sparrowhawk, a northern goshawk, a common buzzard or other flying predators that form a potential danger in the air. A series of high-pitched '' notes are given by both partners before and during copulation. The begging-call is used by juveniles to beg for food from parents.

Learnt behaviours 
An interesting example of culturally transmitted learning in birds was the phenomenon dating from the 1920s of blue tits teaching one another how to open traditional British milk bottles with foil tops, to get at the cream underneath Such behaviour has been suppressed recently by the gradual change of human dietary habits (low-fat or skimmed milk instead of full-fat), and the way of getting them (from a supermarket in plastic containers with hard plastic lids, instead of the milkman). In addition, the instinct to strip bark from trees in search of insects has developed into a tendency to peel building materials such as thatch, wallpaper, stucco and window putty.

Predators and natural threats 
The small size of the Eurasian blue tit makes it vulnerable to prey by larger birds such as jays who catch the vulnerable fledglings when they leave the nest. The most important predator is probably the sparrowhawk, closely followed by the domestic cat. Nests may be robbed by mammals such as weasels and red squirrels, as well as introduced grey squirrels in the UK.

The successful breeding of chicks is dependent on sufficient supply of green caterpillars as well as satisfactory weather. Breeding seasons may be affected badly if the weather is cold and wet between May and July, particularly if this coincides with the emergence of the caterpillars on which the nestlings are fed.

Parasites 

Eurasian blue tits are known to be host to feather mites, and rarely lice and flat flies. In Europe, the only feather mite species known to live on the blue tit host is Proctophyllodes stylifer. However, this mite seems to be of no concern to the bird as, until now, it is only known to feed on dead feather tissue. P. stylifer lives all its developmental stages, i.e. egg, larva, protonymph, tritonymph and adult, within the plumage of the same host. The usual sites where P. stylifer is encountered are the remiges and the rectrices of the bird where they can be found tandemly positioned between the barbs of the rachis.

Status and conservation 
The Eurasian blue tit is classified as a least concern species on the IUCN Red List (version 3.1), and as a Green Status species, since 1996, by the Royal Society for the Protection of Birds in the United Kingdom.

Cultural significance 
The Eurasian blue tit has appeared on many stamps and ornaments. Its most recent appearance on a British stamp was the 2010 Birds of Britain series.

References

External links 

 
 Feathers of Eurasian blue tit (Parus caeruleus) 
 
 
 
 
 

Articles containing video clips
Birds described in 1758
Birds of Europe
Eurasian blue tit
Eurasian blue tit